The Futurians were a group of science fiction (SF) fans, many of whom became editors and writers as well. The Futurians were based in New York City and were a major force in the development of science fiction writing and science fiction fandom in the years 1937–1945.

Origins of the group
As described in Isaac Asimov's 1979 autobiography In Memory Yet Green, the Futurians spun off from the Greater New York Science Fiction Club (headed by Sam Moskowitz, later an influential SF editor and historian) over ideological differences, with the Futurians wishing to take a more overtly Marxist political stance. Other sources indicate that Donald A. Wollheim was pushing for a more left-wing direction with a goal of leading fandom toward a political ideal, all of which Moskowitz resisted. As a result, Wollheim broke off from the Greater New York group and founded the Futurians in September, 1938. The fans following Moskowitz reorganized into the Queens Science Fiction Club.

 
Frederik Pohl, in his autobiography The Way the Future Was, said that the origin of the Futurians lay with the Science Fiction League founded by Hugo Gernsback in 1934, the local New York City chapter of which was called the "Brooklyn Science Fiction League" or BSFL, headed by G. G. Clark.

Wollheim, John Michel, and Robert A. W. Lowndes were also members of the BSFL.  Along with Pohl, the four started calling themselves the "Quadrumvirate".  Pohl, commenting about that time, said "we four marched from Brooklyn to the sea, leaving a wide scar of burned out clubs behind us. We changed clubs the way Detroit changes tailfins, every year had a new one, and last year's was junk".

There were several club names during that period, before finally settling on the Futurians. In 1935 there was the "East New York Science Fiction League" (ENYSFL), later the "Independent League for Science Fiction" (ILSF).  In 1936 came the International Cosmos Science Club (ICSC), which also involved Will Sykora. Pohl then says that "on reflection 'Cosmos' seemed to take in a bit more territory than was justified, so we changed it to the International Scientific Association (it wasn't International either, but then it also wasn't scientific)".   The ISA then was renamed New York Branch-International Scientific Association (NYB-ISA).

In 1937, after a falling-out with Will Sykora and others, the "Quadrumvirate" went on to found the Futurians.  Sykora then founded the Queens Science Fiction League with Sam Moskowitz and James V. Taurasi.  Later, the QSFL changed into New Fandom.   Pohl said the New Fandom and the Futurians were "Addicted to Feuds", that "No CIA nor KGB ever wrestled so valiantly for the soul of an emerging nation as New Fandom and the Futurians did for science fiction".

Most of the group's members also had professional ambitions within science fiction and related fields, and collectively were very effective at achieving this goal, as the roster of members suggests.  At one point in the earliest 1940s, approximately half of all the pulp SF and fantasy magazines in the U.S. were being edited by Futurians:  Frederik Pohl at the Popular Publications offshoot Fictioneers, Inc. (Astonishing Stories and Super-Science Stories); Robert Lowndes at Columbia Publications, most notably with Science Fiction and Future Fiction (though through the decade to come, Lowndes's responsibilities would expand to other types of fiction magazine in the chain), and Donald Wollheim at the very marginal Albing Publications with the short-lived, micro-budgeted Cosmic Stories and Stirring Science Stories (Wollheim soon moved on to Avon Books; Doë "Leslie Perri" Baumgardt also worked on a romance fiction title for Albing). Most of these projects had small editorial budgets, and relied in part, or occasionally entirely, on contributions from fellow Futurians for their contents.

Political tendencies

At the time the Futurians were formed, Donald Wollheim was strongly attracted by communism and believed that followers of science fiction "should actively work for the realization of the scientific world-state as the only genuine justification for their activities and existence". It was to this end that Wollheim formed the Futurians, and many of its members were in some degree interested in the political applications of science fiction.  Members of the Futurians, including Wollheim, Michel, Lowndes, and Cohen briefly became interested in Technocracy, a utopian movement led by Howard Scott, and attended a study course, although they later dismissed Scott as a "crackpot".

Hence the group included supporters of Trotskyism, like Judith Merril and others who would have been deemed far left for the era (Frederik Pohl became a member of the Communist Party in 1936, but quit in 1939).

Pohl, in his autobiography, The Way the Future Was, said Wollheim voted for Republican Presidential Candidate Alfred Landon in 1936.

Members included

 Isaac Asimov
 Elise Balter (also known as Elsie Wollheim)
 James Blish
 Hannes Bok
 Daniel Burford
 Chester Cohen
 Rosalind Cohen (later Mrs. Dirk Wylie)
 Harry Dockweiler (also known as Dirk Wylie)
 Jack Gillespie
 Virginia Kidd
 Damon Knight
 Cyril Kornbluth
 Mary Byers (also known as Mary Kornbluth)
 Walter Kubilius
 David Kyle
 Herman Leventman
 Robert A. W. Lowndes
 Judith Merril
 John Michel
 Frederik Pohl
 Leslie Perri, a pseudonym of Doris "Doë" Baumgardt
 Jack Rubinson
 Larry Shaw
 Richard Wilson
 Donald A. Wollheim

See also
 1st World Science Fiction Convention

References

Further reading
 In Memory Yet Green by Isaac Asimov (1979)
 The Futurians by Damon Knight (1977)
 The Way The Future Was by Frederik Pohl (1978)
 All Our Yesterdays by Harry Warner, Jr. (1969)

External links
 Frederik Pohl profile with several paragraphs on the Futurians
 Frederik Pohl blogging on the Futurians
 Fancyclopedia II: F (see the entries under FUTURIANS, and FUTURIAN HOUSES)
 List of articles about the Futurians and old Fandom by David Kyle
 "Moskowitz, the Futurians and the Great Exclusion Act of 1939" by David Kyle
 "Caravan to the Stars" by David Kyle

 
Science fiction organizations
Organizations established in 1938